An Bangjun (July 20, 1573 – November 13, 1654) was one of the Neo-Confucian scholars, politicians and writers of the Korean Joseon Dynasty and he was a Righteous army(Uibyong) leader during the Japanese invasions of Korea.

His art names were Usan and Eunbong, a Chinese style name was Saeon.

Biography
He was born and died in Boseong, South Jeolla Province.

Works 
Works are:
'Eunbongjeonseo' (은봉전서, 隱峰全書)
'Samwongisa' (삼원기사, 三寃記事)
'Gimyoyujeoknoralsusa' (기묘유적노랄수사, 己卯遺蹟老辣瀡辭):Recordings related to the  Gimyo Sahwa
'Sawoogamgyerok' (사우감계록, 師友鑑戒錄)
'Honjeongrok' (혼정록, 混定錄)
'Honjeongpyunrok' (혼정편록, 混定編錄)
'Maehwanmoondap' (매환문답, 買還問答)
'Hanguishinpyun' (항의신편, 抗義新編)
'Leedaewonjeon' (이대원전, 李大源傳)
'Honamuibyungrok' (호남의병록, 湖南義兵錄)
'Boosangisa' (부산기사, 釜山記事)
'Noryanggisa' (노량기사, 露粱記事)

References

1573 births
1654 deaths
People from South Jeolla Province
16th-century Korean poets
Korean generals
Joseon politicians
Korean scholars
Korean Confucianists
Korean military personnel killed in action
People of the Japanese invasions of Korea (1592–1598)
Military history of Korea
17th-century Korean philosophers
Neo-Confucian scholars
Juksan Ahn clan
17th-century Korean poets